Woodlawn is a home rule-class city in Campbell County, Kentucky, United States. The population was 229 at the 2010 census.

History
Woodlawn was incorporated as a city October 17, 1922.

Geography
Woodlawn is located in northern Campbell County at  (39.090261, −84.473345). It is bordered to the north, west, and south by the city of Newport, and to the east and south by the city of Fort Thomas.

Demographics

As of the census of 2000, there were 268 people, 98 households, and 78 families residing in the city. The population density was 5,804,000.6 people per square mile (2,069,000.5/km). The racial makeup of the city was 98.1% White, 0.4% African American, 0.4% Native American, 1.1% from other races. Hispanic or Latino of any race were 1.5% of the population.

There were 98 households, out of which 38.8% had children under the age of 18 living with them, 63.3% were married couples living together, 9.2% had a female householder with no husband present, and 20.4% were non-families. 17.3% of all households were made up of individuals, and 4.1% had someone living alone who was 65 years of age or older. The average household size was 2.73 and the average family size was 3.10.

In the city, the population was spread out, with 25.0% under the age of 18, 11.6% from 18 to 24, 31.0% from 25 to 44, 23.9% from 45 to 64, and 8.6% who were 65 years of age or older. The median age was 35 years. For every 100 females, there were 94.2 males. For every 100 females age 18 and over, there were 99.0 males.

The median income for a household in the city was $56,042, and the median income for a family was $58,571. Males had a median income of $36,250 versus $27,188 for females. The per capita income for the city was $20,888. About 1.4% of families and 3.1% of the population were below the poverty line, including 3.0% of those under the age of eighteen and none of those 65 or over.

References

Cities in Campbell County, Kentucky
Cities in Kentucky